Citrinophila unipunctata is a butterfly in the family Lycaenidae. It is found in the Republic of the Congo, the Democratic Republic of the Congo (Equateur, Tshuapa, Sankuru, Lulua and Lualaba), Uganda, and possibly north-western Tanzania.

References

Butterflies described in 1908
Poritiinae
Taxa named by George Thomas Bethune-Baker